Erophylla is a genus of bat in the family Phyllostomidae. It contains the following species:
 Brown flower bat (Erophylla bombifrons)
 Buffy flower bat (Erophylla sezekorni)

References

 
Bat genera
Taxa named by Gerrit Smith Miller Jr.
Taxonomy articles created by Polbot